Gordon Stanley (born December 20, 1951, Boston, Massachusetts, United States) is an American stage actor.

Theatre career
His first professional stage appearance came in a production of Richard III at the Court Theatre in Chicago in 1969. His Off-Broadway debut came in 1977 in Lyrical and Satirical. His Broadway debut was in 1980 in the musical Onward Victoria.

Stanley has performed in numerous Broadway shows, including Ragtime, Joseph and the Amazing Technicolor Dreamcoat, Beauty and the Beast, and Cabaret.

Personal life
Stanley married Renee Lutz, a stage manager on May 18, 1980.

Filmography
Stanley has sung in the animated musical films Beauty and the Beast, Pocahontas, The Hunchback of Notre Dame, and Aladdin and the King of Thieves.

Stage credits
Broadway
 Onward Victoria (1980) -- as Fleming
 Joseph and the Amazing Technicolor Dreamcoat (1982) -- as Jacob
 Into the Light (1986) -- as Signor Bocciarelli
 Teddy & Alice (1987) -- as Elihu Root
 Meet Me in St. Louis (1989) -- as Dr. Bond/Ensemble
 Beauty and the Beast (1994) -- as Bookseller/Monsieur D'Arque/Townsperson/Enchanted Object
 Ragtime (1998) -- as Reporter/Trolley Conductor/Charles S. Whitman/Ensemble
 Cabaret (1998) -- as Herr Schultz (replacement)

Off-Broadway
 Joseph and the Amazing Technicolor Dreamcoat (1981) -- as Jacob
 Diamonds (1984) -- as Men
 Moby Dick (1986) -- as Peleg/ Captain of Rachel
 Who Does She Think She Is? (1987)
 All's Well That Ends Well (2006) -- as Reynaldo/Street Singer
 Take Me Along (2008) -- as Dave McComber 
 Flamingo Court (2009) -- N/A
 White Woman Street (2010) -- as Mo Mason
 Lies My Father Told Me (2013) -- as Mr. Baumgarten / Proprietor

Regional and national tours
 Under Milkwood (1970) -- as First Voice (Court Theatre (Chicago)|Court Theatre)
 A Midsummer Night's Dream (opera) (1976) -- as Puck (Curtis Opera Theatre)
 Annie (1978) -- Harold Ickes (National Tour)
 Allegro (1978) --as Charlie (Equity Library Theatre)
 Carousel (1980) -- as Mr. Snow  (Coachlight Theatre)
 Fiddler on the Roof (1981) -- as Motel (Artpark Theatre)
 A Little Night Music (1981) -- as Mr. Erlanson (York Theatre)
 The Desert Song (1981) -- as Sid el Kar (Light Opera of Manhattan)
 Two on the Isles (1981) -- as Rodney (Actors' Holiday)
 My Fair Lady (1983)  -- as Freddy  (Theatre of the Stars)
 Sullivan and Gilbert (1984) -- as Courtice Pounds (Stage Arts Theatre Company)
 Elizabeth and Essex (1984) -- as Cecil  (York Theatre)
 Red, Hot and Blue (1984) -- Fingers (Equity Library Theatre)
 Lightin' Out (1992) -- (Judith Anderson Theatre)
 Funny Girl (2003) -- as Keeney/Mr. Rinaldi (Barrington Stage Company)
 Show Boat (2008) -- as Cap'n Andy (North Shore Music Theatre)
 The Crucible (2010) -- as Giles Corey(Barrington Stage Company)
 1776 (2013) -- as Stephen Hopkins (Pittsburgh Public Theater)
 Much Ado About Nothing'' (2013) -- (Barrington Stage Company)

References

External links
 
 
 

1951 births
American male musical theatre actors
Brown University alumni
Living people
Male actors from Massachusetts
Singers from Massachusetts